Conus patricius, common name the patrician cone, is a species of sea snail, a marine gastropod mollusk in the family Conidae, the cone snails and their allies.

Like all species within the genus Conus, these snails are predatory and venomous. They are capable of "stinging" humans, therefore live ones should be handled carefully or not at all.

Description
The size of an adult shell varies between 30 mm and 120 mm. The shell has a light flesh-color. The spire is gently acuminate. The earlier whorls are tuberculated. The body whorl is pyrriform. The outline is concave below, with revolving striae towards the base.

Distribution
This species is found in the Pacific Ocean from the Gulf of California, Western Mexico, to Ecuador and off the Galápagos Islands.

References

 Filmer R.M. (2001). A Catalogue of Nomenclature and Taxonomy in the Living Conidae 1758 – 1998. Backhuys Publishers, Leiden. 388pp
 Tucker J.K. (2009). Recent cone species database. September 4, 2009 Edition
 Puillandre N., Duda T.F., Meyer C., Olivera B.M. & Bouchet P. (2015). One, four or 100 genera? A new classification of the cone snails. Journal of Molluscan Studies. 81: 1–23

Gallery

External links
 The Conus Biodiversity website
 
 Cone Shells – Knights of the Sea

patricius
Gastropods described in 1843